Thomas B. Wilson (born 18 May 1962) is a Puerto Rican equestrian. He competed in the individual eventing at the 1988 Summer Olympics.

References

External links
 

1962 births
Living people
Puerto Rican male equestrians
Olympic equestrians of Puerto Rico
Equestrians at the 1988 Summer Olympics
Place of birth missing (living people)